"You" is a song recorded by Macedonian singer Vasil Garvanliev. The song was written and produced by Nevena Neskoska alongside Alice Schroeder and Kalina Neskoska. Javier Lloret de Muller, Darko Dimitrov and Lazar Cvetkovski provided additional production.

The song was scheduled to represent North Macedonia in the 2020 Eurovision Song Contest in Rotterdam, the Netherlands, after being internally selected by the national broadcaster MRT. However, the contest was later cancelled due to the COVID-19 pandemic.

Background

Composition 

Lasting three minutes, the English-language song, "You", was composed by Macedonian composer Nevena Neskoska and written by the latter together with Alice Schroeder and Kalina Neskoska. Along with Nevena Neskoska and Javier Lloret de Muller, Macedonian producers Darko Dimitrov and Lazar Cvetkoski were also helmed for the record's production process.

Promotion 

An accompanying music video for "You" was officially premiered onto the YouTube channel of the Eurovision Song Contest on 8 March 2020. The vibrant video was directed by Milena Vitman and produced by Jellmaz Dervishi while it was solely edited and recorded by Gjorgi Vacev. Visually, its message is an "invitation for everyone to connect, open up, dance, and celebrate the moment".

At Eurovision 

The 2020 Eurovision Song Contest was scheduled to take place in Rotterdam, the Netherlands, consisting of two semi-finals on 12 May and 14 May 2020, and the grand final on 16 May 2020. Each participating country, except the host country and the Big Five, is required to qualify from one of two semi-finals to compete for the grand final. On 28 January 2020, a special allocation draw was held which placed each country into one of the two semi-finals, as well as which half of the show they would perform in. North Macedonia was placed into the first semi-final, to be held on 12 May 2020, and was scheduled to perform in the first half of the show. In March 2020, the European Broadcasting Union cancelled the contest due to the COVID-19 pandemic.

References

External links
Official music video

2020 singles
2020 songs
Eurovision songs of North Macedonia
Eurovision songs of 2020
Song recordings produced by Darko Dimitrov
Vasil Garvanliev songs